Akeem Elijah Adams (13 April 1991 – 30 December 2013) was a Trinidadian international footballer who played as a defender.

Club career

Early career
Adams spent his early career in Trinidad with W Connection, T&TEC SC, United Petrotrin and Central.

Akeem received a trial with the Seattle Sounders of Major League Soccer and played the second half of an international friendly against Chivas de Guadalajara on October 12, 2010 in Seattle.

Ferencváros, illness and death
In August 2013, Akeem signed a contract with Hungarian club Ferencváros.

On 25 September 2013, Adams suffered a heart attack. His condition did not improve quickly enough and his left leg had to be amputated on October 8 in a life-saving surgery.

His doctor stated that his body was not ready for a heart transplant that would be necessary to keep him alive.

On 28 December 2013, Adams suffered a stroke while at the Városmajori Heart Clinic and fell into a coma. He died in Budapest on 30 December 2013.

International career
Adams played youth international football with the Trinidad and Tobago under-17 team, participating in the 2007 FIFA U-17 World Cup and was part of the under-20 squad at 2009 FIFA U-20 World Cup. Adams made his full international debut in March 2008 at age 16, in a 1-0 victory against El Salvador.

Personal life
His brother is fellow player Akini Adams.

References

1991 births
2013 deaths
Trinidad and Tobago footballers
Trinidad and Tobago youth international footballers
Trinidad and Tobago international footballers
W Connection F.C. players
Central F.C. players
United Petrotrin F.C. players
Ferencvárosi TC footballers
TT Pro League players
Nemzeti Bajnokság I players
Trinidad and Tobago expatriate footballers
Expatriate footballers in Hungary
Trinidad and Tobago expatriate sportspeople in Hungary
Association football defenders
2009 CONCACAF U-20 Championship players
Trinidad and Tobago under-20 international footballers